Vincent Eze Ogbulafor (24 May 1949 – 6 October 2022) was a Nigerian politician.

He was the Chairman of the Opposition, as a member of the People's Democratic Party of Nigeria. Prior to this post, he was National Secretary of the party. He resigned his appointment as the chair after he was charged for an alleged financial recklessness while serving as a minister.

He was a Prince of Olokoro, Umuahia South, the local government of Abia State.

Ogbulafor died on 6 October 2022, at the age of 73.

References

1949 births
2022 deaths
Nigerian Roman Catholics
Igbo people
Igbo politicians
National Working Committee chairs
People from Abia State